Casimir Jürgens (born 26 December 1994) is a Finnish professional ice hockey player. He is currently playing for Tappara of the Finnish Liiga. Jürgens made his Liiga debut appearance for Pelicans during the 2017–18 Liiga season. In April 2018, he made his debut in the Finland men's national ice hockey team.

References

External links
 

1994 births
Living people
Tappara players
Lahti Pelicans players
Finnish ice hockey defencemen
Ice hockey people from Helsinki